Autosticha hainanica is a moth in the family Autostichidae. It was described by Kyu-Tek Park and Chun-Sheng Wu in 2003. It is found in Hainan, China.

The wingspan is 13–15 mm. The forewings are yellowish, the costa with fuscous scales at the extreme base and brownish orange beyond it. The hindwings are pale grey.

Etymology
The species name refers to the type location.

References

Moths described in 2003
Autosticha
Moths of Asia